Kaningra (Kaningara) language is a Sepik language of Papua New Guinea.

It is spoken in two villages, including Kaningara village of Karawari Rural LLG in East Sepik Province.

References

Alamblak languages
Languages of East Sepik Province
Vulnerable languages